A fountain is a piece of architecture that pours or jets water for drinking or for decorative effect.

Fountain or Fountains may also refer to:

Arts and entertainment

 Fountain (1988 film), a Russian film directed by Yuri Mamin
 Fountain (Duchamp), a 1917 sculpture by Marcel Duchamp
 Fountain (juggling), a juggling pattern
 "Fountain", a song by PJ Harvey from the 1992 album Dry
 "Fountain (I Am Good)", a song by Mosaic MSC from the 2020 album Human
 "Fountains", a song by Drake from the 2021 album Certified Lover Boy

People
Albert Jennings Fountain (1838–1896), American lawyer and politician 
Ben Fountain (born 1958), American fiction writer
Clarence Fountain (1929–2018), American gospel singer of The Blind Boys of Alabama
Daurice Fountain (born 1995), American football player
Hyleas Fountain (born 1981), American heptathlete
Nigel Fountain (born 1944), British writer and journalist
Pete Fountain (1930–2016), American jazz clarinetist
Fountain E. Pitts (1808–1874), American Methodist minister and Confederate chaplain
Fountain Hughes (1848–1957), former slave interviewed by Library of Congress as part of the Federal Writers' Project

Places

Canada
 Fountain, British Columbia
Xaxli'p First Nation, or the Fountain or the Fountain Indian Band, a First Nations government

United States
 Fountain, Colorado
 Fountain, Florida
 Fountain, Illinois
 Fountain, Indiana
 Fontanet, Indiana, also known as Fountain or Fountain Station
 Fountain County, Indiana
 Fountain City, Indiana
 Fountain, Michigan
 Fountain, Minnesota
 Fountain, North Carolina
 Fountain City, Knoxville, Tennessee
 Fountain, West Virginia
 Fountain, Wisconsin
 Fountain City, Wisconsin
 Fountain County, Jefferson Territory 1859–1861

Elsewhere
 Fountain, U.S. Virgin Islands

Other uses
 Fountain (heraldry), a roundel with wavy blue and white stripes in heraldry
 Fountain (markup language), an open-source markup language for screenwriting
 Fountain F.C., a Nigerian football club
 Fountain syndrome, a congenital disorder 
 Fountain University, in Osogbo, Nigeria
 Drinking fountain, a fountain designed to provide drinking water
 Soda fountain, a carbonated drink dispenser
 Gerb (pyrotechnic), or fountain, a type of firework

See also

 The Fountain (disambiguation)
 Fountain Creek (disambiguation)
 Fountain Hill (disambiguation)
 Fountain House (disambiguation)
 Fountain of Youth (disambiguation)
 Fountain Square (disambiguation)
 Fountain Township (disambiguation)
 Fountain Valley (disambiguation)
 Centennial Fountain (disambiguation)
 Fountaine, a surname
 Fountains Abbey, a ruined monastery in Yorkshire, England
 Fountains Fell, a mountain in the Yorkshire Dales, England